Likwidation is the third studio album by American hip hop group Tha Alkaholiks. It was released on August 26, 1997 via Loud Records. Recording sessions took place at Enterprise Studio in Burbank, California, at Yo Mama's House and at Sound Castle Recording Studios in Los Angeles. Production was primarily handled by member E-Swift, as well as Madlib, Easy Mo Bee, T-Smoov, and Marley Marl. It features guest appearances from Xzibit, Keith Murray, King Tee, Lootpack, Ol' Dirty Bastard, Phil da Agony, The WhoRidas, with cameos from DeBarge, LL Cool J and Nas. The album peaked at number 57 on the Billboard 200 and number 15 on Top R&B Albums. Its lead single, "Hip Hop Drunkies", became the group's biggest hit in 1997, peaking at #66 on the Billboard Hot 100 chart.

Following the release of Likwidation, group member Tash temporarily went solo, and released the album Rap Life in 1999. The group didn't return with another album until 2001, with the release of X.O. Experience under 'Tha Liks'.

Track listing

Notes
 signifies a co-producer

Sample credits
Track 6 contains elements from "The Breaks" written by Kurtis Walker, JB Moore, Robert Ford, Russell Simmons & Lawrence Smith, performed by Kurtis Blow
Track 11 contains elements from "Love Spell" written by Bill Curtis, performed by the Fatback Band
Track 15 contains elements from "Don't Tell It" written by Deidra Brown, Deanna Brown and Yamma Brown, performed by James Brown
Track 17 contains elements from "Too High" written and performed by Stevie Wonder

Personnel
DJ Romes – scratches (tracks: 5, 15)
Morris Rentie Jr. – bass (track 6)
Eric "Bobo" Correa – percussion (track 6)
James Macon – guitar (track 13)
Derrick Davis – flute (track 17)
Eric Brooks – engineering
Eric Lynch – engineering
Steve "Fred 40 To The Head" Fredrickson – engineering
Gabe Chiesa – engineering
Jean-Marie Horvat – engineering
Marlon Williams – engineering
Mark Chalecki – mastering
Natas Kaupas – art direction, layout
Philippe McClelland – photography
Dave McEowen – lacquer cut
Noa Ochi – A&R direction
Che Harris – A&R
Laurie Marks – A&R

Charts

Singles chart positions

References

External links

1997 albums
Loud Records albums
Tha Alkaholiks albums
Albums produced by Madlib
Albums produced by Easy Mo Bee